The 1999 Katsina State gubernatorial election occurred on 9 January 1999. PDP candidate Umaru Musa Yar'Adua won the election, defeating Junaidu Mamuda Yantumaki, the APP candidate.

Results
Umaru Musa Yar'Adua from the PDP won the election. APP and AD candidates contested in the election.

The total number of registered voters in the state was 2,236,067, total votes cast was 939,282, valid votes was 881,783 and rejected votes was 57,499.

Umaru Musa Yar'Adua, (PDP)- 586,681
APP- 286,945
AD- 8,157

References 

Katsina State gubernatorial election
Katsina State gubernatorial election
1999